Gustaf Lagerbielke may refer to:
 Gustaf Lagerbjelke, Swedish politician
 Gustaf Lagerbielke (footballer), Swedish footballer